Eupithecia salti is a moth in the family Geometridae. It was described by David Stephen Fletcher in 1951. It is found in Tanzania.

References

Endemic fauna of Tanzania
Moths described in 1951
salti
Insects of Tanzania
Moths of Africa